Etirinotecan pegol (trade name Onzeald) is a drug developed by Nektar Therapeutics for the treatment of certain kinds of breast cancer with brain metastases. The European Medicines Agency refused to grant it a marketing authorisation in 2017.

It works as a topoisomerase I inhibitor. Chemically, it consists of four units of irinotecan (a topoisomerase I inhibitor in use since the late 1990s) linked by carboxymethyl glycine and polyethylene glycol (PEG) chains to a central pentaerythritol ether, resulting in a much longer biological half-life (38 days) than that of irinotecan. It is formulated as a dihydrochloride and with 1.2 units of trifluoroacetate.

References 

Topoisomerase inhibitors